DWBG (95.9 FM), broadcasting as 95.9 Big Sound FM, is a radio station owned by Capricom Production and Management and operated by Vanguard Radio Network. The station's studio is located at #214B Tin St., Brgy. Upper Quezon Hill, Baguio.

History
The station was established in 1994 as Big FM. It was formerly located along Second Road, Quezon Hill Proper before moving to the roofdeck of Abanao Square along Abanao St. cor. Zandueta St. a few years later. In January 2007, it went off the air. It returned to air in 2013, this time as Big Sound FM under the management of Vanguard Radio Network.

References

Radio stations in Baguio
Radio stations established in 1994